Serhiy Matyukhin (born 21 March 1980) is a Ukrainian retired professional footballer and coach.

Career
Most of his career, Matyukhin spent in FC Dnipro Dnipropetrovsk from 1997 to 2010. In his early career, he played for FC Dnipro-2 Dnipropetrovsk which is the second team and it used to take part in the professional competitions during that time. In 2009 Matyukhin was loaned to FC Arsenal Kyiv and completed the permanent move in the following league campaign.

References

External links

Player profile
 

1980 births
Living people
Ukrainian footballers
FC Dnipro players
FC Dnipro-2 Dnipropetrovsk players
FC Dnipro-3 Dnipropetrovsk players
FC Kryvbas Kryvyi Rih players
FC Arsenal Kyiv players
FC Oleksandriya players
Ukrainian Premier League players
Ukrainian First League players
Ukrainian Second League players
Ukrainian Amateur Football Championship players
Ukraine international footballers
Association football defenders
Sportspeople from Donetsk Oblast